David North (born 1950) is an American Marxist theoretician. He is the national chairman of the Socialist Equality Party in the United States (SEP), formerly the Workers League. He served as the national secretary of the SEP until the party's congress in 2008. North was the principal political and theoretical leader of the International Committee of the Fourth International during the organization's split with the Workers Revolutionary Party in Britain.

North is the chairman of the International Editorial Board of the World Socialist Web Site, an outlet of the ICFI. The author of several books and articles on the history of the Socialist movement, North lectures in politics and the history of Marxism.

Political career 
Born in 1950, North studied history in Connecticut, and became politicized by left-wing movements in the United States in 1968. He stated that he was influenced by the Vietnam War, but also by the historical experiences of World War II, fascism and The Holocaust.

As an American Trotskyist, North is a longtime leader of the Socialist Equality Party (SEP). North is chair of the editorial board of the SEP's associated publication the World Socialist Web Site, which claims a readership of 250,000 people each month.

In 2017, North alleged in an open letter that changes to Google's ranking system and search engine (their project known as Project Owl) demoted left-wing outlets such as the WSWS, which describes itself as an "online newspaper of the international Trotskyist movement". Google would not comment to The New York Times about the WSWS. Contacted by the same source, North said: "I’m against censorship in any form. It’s up to people what they want to read."

Views
North has defended the view that Trotsky represented a Marxist alternative to Stalinism, and therefore states that the collapse of the USSR does not mean that Marxism is a failed project. Summarizing these views as described in North's book The Unfinished Twentieth Century, sociologist Charles Thorpe writes that North "makes a powerful case that, to paraphrase Faulkner, these debates and experiences are not dead; they're not even past".

According to political scientist Emanuele Saccarelli, North has argued that contrary to modern academic traditions, Marxism is not defined by academics, but instead by Marxist organizations and Marxist struggle. He writes that this tradition is represented above all by the Trotskyist opposition to Stalinism and its contemporary continuity in the Socialist Equality Party.

Speaking about the 2016 United States presidential election, North told Neues Deutschland that Donald Trump "embodies a cross between all the criminal and immoral features and machinations of the real estate, finance, gambling and entertainment industries".

Interviewed by journalist Chris Hedges in 2018, North stated that while middle class groups promoted identity politics as a response to social tensions and poverty, American workers were not racist and "have a deep belief in democratic rights". North stated that the 20th century problems of war and fascism remained real threats in the 21st century.

In an article co-authored by North in 2014, Vladimir Putin's regime in Russia is characterized as follows:  North anticipated in his writings, such as a co-authored article titled "US imperialism, Ukraine and the danger of World War III" after the ouster of Ukraine's Viktor Yanukovych government, that the developments in Ukraine would lead to war. North further explained his position in 2022, writing, "The Putin regime is the reactionary resurrection of a bourgeois state that emerged out of the 1991 dissolution of the USSR. But the opposition of the International Committee to this regime, including its invasion of Ukraine, is from the socialist left, not the imperialist right." North characterized the Russian invasion of Ukraine as "politically bankrupt and reactionary", but he also maintained, "The outbreak of war in Ukraine has long been foreseen. The relentless expansion of NATO in the aftermath of the dissolution of the Soviet Union has always been directed toward war with Russia."

Criticism 
Writing in socialist magazine New Politics, Lebanese Marxist academic Gilbert Achcar described North as an "apologist for Putin, Assad, and their friends".

Works

Books 
  (Preface via World Socialist Web Site)
 
 
 
 
 
 
 The Russian Revolution and the Unfinished 20th Century (2014)

Lectures and other pamphlets 
 The USSR And Socialism: The Trotskyist Perspective (1989) 
 Ten Years After The Split in the Workers Revolutionary Party: The WRP's Commemoration Of Healy's Expulsion (1995) 
 In Defense of the Russian Revolution: A Reply to the Post-Soviet School of Historical Falsification (1995) 
 Socialism, Historical Truth and the Crisis of Political Thought in the United States (1996) 
 Workers League and the Founding of the Socialist Equality Party (1996) 
 Equality, the Rights of Man and the Birth of Socialism (1996) 
 Anti-Semitism, Fascism and the Holocaust: A critical review of Daniel Goldhagen's "Hitler's Willing Executioners" (1997) 
 A Tribute to Tom Henehan: 1951 to 1977 (1998) 
 Ernest Mandel 1923–1995: A Critical Assessment of His Role in the History of the Fourth International (1997) 
 Marxism and the Trade Unions (1998) 
 Leon Trotsky and Fate of Socialism in 20th Century: A Reply to Professor Eric Hobsbawm (1998) 
 Reform and Revolution in the Epoch of Imperialism (1998) 
 After the Slaughter: Political Lessons of the Balkan War (1999) 
 A Tribute to Vadim Rogovin (1999) 
 The Economic Crisis & the Return of History'' (2011)

References

External links 
 World Socialist Web Site

1950 births
Living people
American socialists
Socialist Equality Party (United States) politicians
American political party founders